Nuestra Belleza Chiapas 2011, was held in Tuxtla Gutiérrez, Chiapas on July 17, 2011. At the conclusion of the final night of competition, Krystell Padilla of  Tonalá was crowned as the winner. Padilla was crowned by outgoing Nuestra Belleza Chiapas titleholder Grisell Hernández. Ten contestants competed for the crown.

Results

Placements

Background Music
Carlos Macías
Daniel Luján

Contestants

References

External links
Official Website

Nuestra Belleza México